Winchester is an unincorporated community located on the west shore of South Turtle Lake in the town of Winchester, Vilas County, Wisconsin, United States. It is locally referred to as the "Winchester Townsite" and is the location of the Winchester Town Library.

References

Unincorporated communities in Vilas County, Wisconsin
Unincorporated communities in Wisconsin